Marino Cassianico (died 992) was an Italian Roman Catholic bishop.

Born in Veneto, Marino Cassianico was named bishop of the Patriarch of Olivolo or Rialto, Italy in 966 and died in 992 while still in office.

References 

Year of birth missing
992 deaths
Bishops of Venice